Gumbonzvanda High School is a high school located in Wedza District, Mashonaland East Province, Zimbabwe. It is known for its victory in soccer under 20 boys which it won a trophy in 2015. It is a high school accommodates form one to form six.

Schools in Zimbabwe
Wedza District